Sedkyrkeshch (Śodkyrköč) is an urban locality (an urban-type settlement) under the administrative jurisdiction of the city of republic significance of Syktyvkar in the Komi Republic, Russia. As of the 2010 Census, its population was 1,999.

Administrative and municipal status
Within the framework of administrative divisions, the urban-type settlement of Sedkyrkeshch, together with one rural locality (the settlement of Trekhozerka), is incorporated as Sedkyrkeshch Urban-Type Settlement Administrative Territory, which is subordinated to the city of republic significance of Syktyvkar. Within the framework of municipal divisions, Sedkyrkeshch is a part of Syktyvkar Urban Okrug.

References

Notes

Sources

Urban-type settlements in the Komi Republic
Syktyvkar
